Amblyseius nicola is a species of mite in the Phytoseiidae family. It was described by Chant and Hansell in 1971.

References

nicola
Animals described in 1971